Benjamin Fields was a professional baseball infielder in the Negro leagues. He played with the Cleveland Cubs, Birmingham Black Barons, Atlanta Black Crackers, and New York Black Yankees from 1932 to 1941.

References

External links
 and Baseball-Reference Black Baseball stats and Seamheads

Atlanta Black Crackers players
Birmingham Black Barons players
Cleveland Cubs players
New York Black Yankees players
Year of birth missing
Year of death missing
Baseball second basemen
Baseball third basemen